Marc Bentley (1968 – November 23, 2020) was an American actor who appeared on television during the late 1970s and early 1980s. The epitome of those sun-blonded surf and sun kids of the era, he was a keen skateboarder.

Bentley grew up in Southern California. Heappeared in such shows as The Young and the Restless, Lou Grant, Fantasy Island and CHiPs. He also starred in the TV-Movies Terror Among Us and The Seduction of Miss Leona, as well as the feature films Hambone and Hillie and Valentine.

Bentley was shortlisted in the Young Artist Awards in 1981 (the first year the awards were made) as best young actor in a daytime series for his part as Chucky Roulland in CBS's The Young and the Restless.

Filmography

References

External links

1968 births
2020 deaths
American male child actors
American male film actors
American male soap opera actors
American male television actors